The 1947 Yugoslav First Basketball League season is the 3rd season of the Yugoslav First Basketball League, the highest professional basketball league in SFR Yugoslavia.

The competition was held as a six-team tournament held in Zagreb.

Regular season

League table

Winning Roster  
The winning roster of Crvena Zvezda:
  Strahinja Alagić
  Milan Bjegojević
  Vasilije Stojković
  Nebojša Popović
  Aleksandar Gec
  Milorad Sokolović
  Borislav Stanković
  Milan Blagojević
  Dragan Godžić
  Aleksandar Nikolić
  Rade Jovanović
  Srđan Kalember
  Đorđe Lazić
  Hristofer Dimitrijević

Coach:  Nebojša Popović

External links  
 Yugoslav First Basketball League Archive 

Yugoslav First Basketball League seasons